Salala is a small village in the state of Punjab located in India. The village falls under District Jalandhar.

About 
Salala lies on the Bhogpur to Adampur connecting road. The village is popular for a Sikh Temple called Gurdwara Shaheed Ganj. The main occupation for the residents living here is agriculture. This village is physically connected to its neighboring village, known as " Khojkipur."
sarpanch kewal Singh next in line Jugraj Sidhu

Postal information 
Salala has its own post office located on the main road near the temple and its postal code is 144102.

References 

 Official website of Punjab Govt. with Salala's details

Villages in Jalandhar district